Kevin Möhwald (born 3 July 1993) is a German professional footballer who plays as a midfielder for Union Berlin.

Career
Möhwald made his debut for Rot-Weiß Erfurt in December 2011, as a substitute for Nils Pfingsten-Reddig in a Thuringia derby against Carl Zeiss Jena which Erfurt lost 1–0.

In May 2018, Werder Bremen announced Möhwald would join the club for the 2018–19 season, moving on a free transfer from 1. FC Nürnberg.

Möhwald moved to Bundesliga club Union Berlin on 30 August 2021.

Career statistics

Reference

External links

1993 births
Living people
Sportspeople from Erfurt
German footballers
Association football midfielders
Germany youth international footballers
FC Rot-Weiß Erfurt players
1. FC Nürnberg players
SV Werder Bremen players
1. FC Union Berlin players
Bundesliga players
2. Bundesliga players
3. Liga players
Regionalliga players
Footballers from Thuringia